Kalyana Kurimanam is a 2005 Indian Malayalam-language film, directed by Udaya Kumar and produced by S. Kumar. The film stars Abbas, Vijayaraghavan and Nandana.

Cast
Abbas 
Vijayaraghavan 
Mithun Ramesh
Nedumudi Venu
Lalu Alex
Jagadish
Sudheesh
Salim Kumar
Rajan P. Dev
Indrans
Kochu Preman
Suraj Venjaramood
Kalashala Babu
P. T. S. Padanayil
Nandana as Kaveri
Chandra Lakshman as Kasthuri
Ambili Devi as Kollus
Ambika
Kaviyoor Renuka as Chandramathi
Sukumari as Madhaviyamma
Kanakalatha 
Bindu Varappuzha as teacher

Soundtrack
The music was composed by Ronnie R. Raphel.

References

External links
 

2005 films
2000s Malayalam-language films